Russell Thomas White  (19 June 1895 – 3 September 1981) was an Australian politician.

He was born at Windermere, Victoria to farmer William Nicholas White and Ellen Janet Banfield. He attended Grenville College in Ballarat and became a dairy farmer at Cardigan. On 20 December 1917 he married Isabel Wade, with whom he had three children. He was the founding president of the local branch of the Country Party, and served on Ballarat Shire Council from 1928–46, with two periods as president (1934–37, 1942–43).

In 1945 he was elected to the Victorian Legislative Assembly for Allandale. In 1951 he was appointed minister without portfolio and cabinet secretary in the Country Party government.

In 1952, he assumed the State Development portfolio. In December 1952 the government was defeated and White moved to the back bench. He changed seats to Ballarat North in 1955 and resigned from parliament in 1960 to become chairman of the Trotting Control Board. He was appointed a Commander of the Order of the British Empire in 1966.

White retired in 1973 and died at Ballarat in 1981.

References

1895 births
1981 deaths
National Party of Australia members of the Parliament of Victoria
Members of the Victorian Legislative Assembly
Australian Commanders of the Order of the British Empire
People from Ballarat
20th-century Australian politicians